The PokerStars Championship was a series of global poker tournaments which began in 2017. The formation of the series was announced in August 2016, when PokerStars revealed that the European Poker Tour and other poker tours were being rebranded. Seven tournament festivals were played in the inaugural season, in the Bahamas, Panama, Macau, Monte Carlo, Sochi, Barcelona and Prague. PokerStars also announced another series of tournaments, PokerStars Festival, which features lower buy-in events. The series was discontinued after the inaugural season.

PSC Main Event winners

Results
Source:

Bahamas
 Venue: Atlantis Resort, Paradise Island, Bahamas
 Buy-in: $5,000
 7-Day Event: January 6-14, 2017
 Number of buy-ins: 738
 Total Prize Pool: $3,376,712
 Number of Payouts: 143

* Deal between the final two players.

Panama
 Venue: Sortis Hotel, Panama City, Panama
 Buy-in: $5,300
 7-Day Event: March 14-20, 2017
 Number of buy-ins: 366
 Total Prize Pool: $1,775,100
 Number of Payouts: 71

Macau
 Venue: City of Dreams, Cotai, Macau
 Buy-in: HKD42,400
 7-Day Event: April 1-9, 2017
 Number of buy-ins: 536
 Total Prize Pool: HKD20,796,800
 Number of Payouts: 103

* Deal between the final two players.

Monte Carlo
 Venue: Monte-Carlo Bay Hotel & Resort, Monte Carlo, Monaco
 Buy-in: €5,300
 7-Day Event: April 29-May 5, 2017
 Number of buy-ins: 727
 Total Prize Pool: €3,525,950
 Number of Payouts: 143

* Deal between the final two players.

Sochi
 Venue: Casino Sochi, Sochi, Russia
 Buy-in: RUB 318,000 ($5,590)
 7-Day Event: May 25-31, 2017
 Number of buy-ins: 387
 Total Prize Pool: 150,000,000
 Number of Payouts: 55

Barcelona
 Venue: Casino Barcelona, Barcelona, Spain
 Buy-in: €5,300
 7-Day Event: August 21-27, 2017
 Number of buy-ins: 1,682
 Total Prize Pool: €8,157,700
 Number of Payouts: 247

* Deal between the final three players.

Prague
 Venue: Casino Atrium Prague, Prague, Czech Republic
 Buy-in: €5,300
 7-Day Event: December 12-18, 2017
 Number of buy-ins: 855
 Total Prize Pool: €4,146,750
 Number of Payouts: 128

* Deal between the final two players.

Future
On December 15, 2017 PokerStars announced that it will bring back regional tour brands in 2018. These include the EPT, Asia Pacific Poker Tour (APPT), and Latin American Poker Tour (LAPT). Therefore, the PokerStars Championship label will no longer be used.

References

External links
Official site

2017 in poker